Paradera is a small town and Census Region near the northeast end of the island of Aruba. The census region Paradera encompasses the town of Paradera as well as nearby settlements and neighborhoods within Paradera, including Ayo, Bloemond, Piedra Plat, and Shiribana. At the time of the 2010 census, Paradera proper had a population of 2,486. The Paradera census region had a population of 12,024.

St. Philomena's Church, a Roman Catholic church, dominates the skyline relative to the rest of the town's buildings. The region of Paradera has an estimated area of 20.40 square kilometers.

Population 
At the time of the 2010 census, the following settlements were counted as a part of the Paradera census region.

Until the 2010 census, previous census data listed the neighborhood of Bloemond in Paradera in place of the town, to distinguish the town from the census region.

References 

Populated places in Aruba
Regions of Aruba